The 2010 Canterbury-Bankstown Bulldogs season was the 76th in the club's history. They competed in the National Rugby League's 2010 Telstra Cup Premiership under coach Kevin Moore. They finished the regular season 13th (out of 16), failing to make the finals.

Telstra Premiership
The club welcomed a new logo and the re-instatement of the "Canterbury-Bankstown" prefix after spending the previous 11 seasons as simply the "Bulldogs". Club record-holder and pointscorer Hazem El Masri had retired at the end of the 2009 season and did not play in 2010.

Former Australian swimming team coach Alan Thompson, a long-time supporter of the Bulldogs, was appointed general manager of the club's football operations on 15 April 2010.

Draw and results
*From Sunday 5 April at 2am, Australia and NZ daylight saving time ends; all games are in AEST.

Ladder

Player movements
Gains

Losses

Squad
The Canterbury Bankstown Bulldogs have signed the below players in first grade to play in the main competition.

See also
 List of Canterbury-Bankstown Bulldogs seasons

References

External links 
Canterbury-Bankstown Bulldogs

Canterbury-Bankstown Bulldogs seasons
Canterbury-Bankstown Bulldogs season